Luc Déry is a French Canadian film producer. He was co-founder of the Montreal-based production company micro_scope, with Kim McCraw.

He is from Hull (Gatineau), Quebec, and studied film at the University of Montreal and arts management at York University.

With McCraw, Déry specialized in "smart, high-end pics designed to attract interest outside Canada". Their films Incendies (2010) and Monsieur Lazhar (2011) both won the Genie Award for Best Motion Picture, and both were nominated for the Academy Award for Best Foreign Language Film.

Filmography 
 The Left-Hand Side of the Fridge (La Moitié gauche du frigo) - 2000
 Soft Shell Man (Un crabe dans la tête) - 2001
 A Problem with Fear - 2003
 Tiresia - 2003
 Saved by the Belles - 2003
 Next: A Primer on Urban Painting - 2005
 Familia - 2005
 Congorama - 2006
 Continental, a Film Without Guns (Continental, un film sans fusil) - 2007
 It's Not Me, I Swear! (C'est pas moi, je le jure!) - 2008
 Incendies - 2010
 Monsieur Lazhar - 2011
 Familiar Grounds - 2011
 Inch'Allah - 2012
 You're Sleeping Nicole (Tu dors Nicole) - 2014
 My Internship in Canada (Guibord s'en va-t-en guerre) - 2015
 Allure - 2017
 For Those Who Don't Read Me (À tous ceux qui ne me lisent pas) - 2018
 My Salinger Year - 2020
 Drunken Birds (Les Oiseaux ivres) - 2021
 The Origin of Evil (L'Origine du mal) - 2022

Awards 
 Best Film, Continental, a Film Without Guns (Continental, un film sans fusil), Jutra Awards (Quebec), 2008
 Best Film, Congorama, Jutra Awards (Quebec), 2007
 CFTPA Award, Producer of the Year, 2006
 Best Film, Soft Shell Man (Un crabe dans la tête), Jutra Awards (Quebec), 2002

References

External links
 

Canadian Screen Award winners
Film producers from Quebec
Living people
People from Gatineau
Université de Montréal alumni
York University alumni
Year of birth missing (living people)
French Quebecers